Kashkalevo (Käşkäläw) is a rural locality (a village) and the administrative centre of Kashkalevsky Selsoviet, Burayevsky District, Bashkortostan, Russia. The population was 271 as of 2010. There are 6 streets.

Geography 
Kashkalevo is located 27 km southeast of Burayevo (the district's administrative centre) by road. Dautlarovo is the nearest rural locality.

References 

Rural localities in Burayevsky District